Operation Lost Honor was the English translated name of a prominent investigation called "Honor Perdido."  The investigation targeted police corruption on Puerto Rican soil that took place in August 2001. Organized by the Federal Bureau of Investigation (FBI) and led by Special Agent Jeffrey Pelaez and Puerto Rico Police Officer Elvin Quinones,  the investigation was initiated subsequent to multiple reports about illegal activity within the Puerto Rico Police Department (PRPD).  The twelve month long undercover operation targeted law enforcement officials suspected of involvement with the drug trade on the island. At the time, it was the biggest case of officer corruption that the FBI had dealt with in the organization's entire history.

Chain of events 
Thirty-two police officers were caught on videotape drug trafficking, thanks to the FBI-initiated undercover operation and the elite FBI Special Operations Group (SOG). Initiated after receiving multiple reports of police officers involved directly in drug trafficking, police officers were videotaped off-loading boats filled with cocaine, transporting cocaine in their squad cars, providing advice on the best way to dispose of homicide victims and offering to commit murder.  The operation additionally aimed to stop the illicit protection provided to certain cocaine dealers who shipped their contraband throughout the island. A total of thirty-four individuals were arrested in the case.

Criminal activities offered by the targeted officers include one individual's agreement to kill a drug dealer for $20,000 in cash. An evidence technician provided help on how to dispose of a homicide victim as well. Rogelio Guevara, special agent in charge of the DEA's Caribbean Field Division, commented that those arrested "don't deserve the honor of being called police officers".

Aftermath 
At the time, Operation Lost Honor was the biggest case of officer corruption that the FBI had dealt with in the organization's entire history.

Orlando Sentinel journalist Ivan Roman stated that the bust "stunned a department already reeling from a series of" previous scandals.

Continuing issues regarding police misconduct and other problems dogged the PRPD years after Operation Lost Honor.

See also 
 Operation Guard Shack

References 

2001 in Puerto Rico
Federal Bureau of Investigation operations
Police misconduct in Puerto Rico
Political corruption investigations in the United States